The Jordan EJ10, and an updated version, the EJ10B, was the car with which the Jordan team competed in the 2000 Formula One season.  

The chassis number was changed from its traditional format of (for example) Jordan 199 for 1999, to EJ10 to celebrate the team's tenth season in Formula One under Eddie Jordan.

Overview 
After their successful 1999 campaign ended in a third place finish in the constructors' championship, 2000 was seen as a massive disappointment. Although the car showed flashes of promise and usually competed for "best of the rest" honours after the dominant Ferrari and McLaren teams, the car proved disappointingly unreliable, only finishing 15 times out of a possible 34. In the end, the team slipped to sixth overall in the constructors' championship with just 17 points scored. The high points were Heinz-Harald Frentzen's two podiums at Interlagos and Indianapolis, and three front-row starting positions. In addition to the reliability problems of the EJ10, several points were also lost through incidents - including Frentzen crashing out late on from second place at Monte Carlo, and both cars being eliminated in a six car pile-up on the opening lap at Monza.

During the course of the season, the team announced a works Honda engine deal for 2001, putting it in direct competition with BAR.  The car's designer, Mike Gascoyne, was also placed on gardening leave during the season after he expressed a desire to join Benetton the following year.

Jordan used 'Benson & Hedges' logos, except at the British, French and United States Grands Prix.

Eddie Jordan later marketed a drink called EJ-10.

Complete Formula One results
(key) (results in bold indicate pole position)

References

External links

Jordan Formula One cars
2000 Formula One season cars